Ariel Caticha  is a professor of theoretical physics at State University of New York at Albany (SUNY Albany) and chair of its department of physics. His research interests include Information Physics (Entropic Foundations of Quantum Mechanics, Statistical Mechanics and General Relativity), Entropic and Bayesian Inference, and Information Geometry.

Education 

Ph.D. California Institute of Technology
B.Sc. and M.Sc. UNICAMP, Brazil

Career 

His most cited papers are 

 Caticha, Ariel, and S. Caticha-Ellis. "Dynamical theory of x-ray diffraction at Bragg angles near π 2." Physical Review B 25.2 (1982): 971. (cited 125 times according to Google Scholar)
 Caticha, Ariel, and Adom Giffin. "Updating probabilities." arXiv preprint physics/0608185 (2006). (cited 116 times)
 Caticha, Ariel. "Transition-diffracted radiation and the Cerenkov emission of x rays." Physical Review A 40.8 (1989): 4322. (cited 98 times)
 Caticha, Ariel, and Roland Preuss. "Maximum entropy and Bayesian data analysis: Entropic prior distributions." Physical Review E 70.4 (2004): 046127. (cited 90 times)
Caticha, Ariel. "Consistency, amplitudes, and probabilities in quantum theory." Physical Review A 57.3 (1998): 1572. (cited 77 times)

References

Year of birth missing (living people)
Living people
California Institute of Technology alumni
State University of Campinas alumni
21st-century American physicists
University at Albany, SUNY faculty
Place of birth missing (living people)